Jammu is the winter capital and second largest city of Jammu and Kashmir, India.

Jammu may also refer to:
 Jammu district, a district of Jammu and Kashmir
 Jammu Division, one of the two regions that make up the union territory of Jammu and Kashmir
 Jammu (Lok Sabha constituency), Indian parliamentary constituency 
 Jammu Tawi railway station, in India
 Jammu Cantonment, a cantonment in Jammu and Kashmir

People with the given name
 Jammu Siltavuori (1926–2012), known as Jammu-setä (Uncle Jammu), Finnish child abuser and murderer

See also
 Jammu and Kashmir (disambiguation)
 Azad Kashmir, part of the Pakistani-administered Kashmir region
 
 Jamu, an Indonesian traditional medicine
 Jamu (disambiguation)